Jack Campagnolo (born 15 June 1998) is a Italy international rugby league footballer who plays as a  for the South Sydney Rabbitohs in the NSW Cup.

Background
Campagnolo was born in Tully, Queensland, Australia. He is of Italian descent.

Playing career

Club career
Campagnolo played in 21 games, and scored 3 tries for the South Sydney Rabbitohs in the 2022 NSW Cup.

International career
In 2022 Campagnolo was named in the Italy squad for the 2021 Rugby League World Cup.

References

External links
Sunshine Coast Falcons profile
Italy profile

1998 births
Living people
Australian rugby league players
Australian people of Italian descent
Italy national rugby league team players
Rugby league five-eighths
Rugby league players from Queensland